Dubrovnik Avenue is an avenue located in the Novi Zagreb part of Zagreb, Croatia. It is mostly six or eight lanes wide. Built in the mid 1950s, it runs for 4 kilometers between the roundabout beneath the southward extension of the Youth Bridge in the east and the Remetinec Roundabout in the west of Novi Zagreb. Its most important intersections are those with Većeslav Holjevac and Germany Avenues. Being the main east–west thoroughfare of Novi Zagreb, more than 40,000 commuters travel on it daily.

Buildings

The multiple pavilions hosting the Zagreb Fair are located on the street. Additionally, the First Gymnasium is on 36 Dubrovnik Avenue.

References

External links 

Roads in Zagreb
Novi Zagreb